Nicola Volpe (died 1540) was a Roman Catholic prelate who served as Bishop of Sant'Angelo dei Lombardi e Bisaccia (1517–1540).

On 23 December 1517, Nicola Volpe was appointed during the papacy of Pope Leo X as Bishop of Sant'Angelo dei Lombardi e Bisaccia.
He served as Bishop of Sant'Angelo dei Lombardi e Bisaccia until his death in 1540.

References

External links and additional sources
 (for Chronology of Bishops) 
 (for Chronology of Bishops) 

16th-century Italian Roman Catholic bishops
Bishops appointed by Pope Leo X
1540 deaths
Archbishops of Sant'Angelo dei Lombardi-Conza-Nusco-Bisaccia